Wólka Zaleska  is a village in the administrative district of Gmina Wyszki, within Bielsk County, Podlaskie Voivodeship, in north-eastern Poland.

According to the 1921 census, the village was inhabited by 86 people, among whom 81 were Roman Catholic and 5 Mosaic. At the same time, 81 inhabitants declared Polish nationality, 5 Jewish. There were 18 residential buildings in the village.

References

Villages in Bielsk County